Równia  (Rivnia) is a village in the administrative district of Gmina Ustrzyki Dolne, within Bieszczady County, Subcarpathian Voivodeship, in south-eastern Poland.

The village has a population of 480.

References

Villages in Bieszczady County